The Second Summer of the Sisterhood (also known as The Second Summer) is a novel written in 2003 by author Ann Brashares. The story continues the adventures of four best friends who own a magical pair of jeans that fit all of them, even though they are different sizes. During the summer, the girls share the pants. The book is the second installment in a series of five books:  The Sisterhood of the Traveling Pants (2001), Girls in Pants (2004), Forever in Blue (2007), and Sisterhood Everlasting (2011).

The book was one of three adapted into a film The Sisterhood of the Traveling Pants 2 (2008).

Characters

The Sisterhood
Lena Kaligaris, sometimes called Lenny,  is a beautiful, quiet, and shy artist of Greek heritage. She has a sister, Effie, who is fourteen years old. Lena spent last summer with their paternal grandparents in Santorini, Greece, where Lena met and fell in love with Kostos. They sent letters back and forth until January, when Lena ended their correspondence because she couldn't stand missing him all year. She is shocked, then elated, when Kostos visits America during this summer. They reunite and profess their love for each other, and spend many happy hours kissing. Then, suddenly, something comes up and Kostos has to leave, leaving her behind to wonder what was wrong. Lena and her family soon travel to Greece when they learn that her Bapi has had a stroke; when they arrive there, they learn that he has died. Lena is devastated and becomes even more so when she finds out that Kostos is now married. He tells her that, after she broke up with him, he was depressed and slept with a woman, who is now pregnant. Kostos tells her that he doesn't love his wife, but must be a "gentleman" and marry her. He makes it clear, though, that he loves Lena and always will. At the end of the summer, Lena meets Carmen's stepbrother, Paul. They are attracted to each other and Carmen exchanged the 'Love Pants' with her so that Lena could wear them while she talked to Paul.
 Tibby Rollins is the rebellious daughter of former radicals. Her interest in filmmaking leads her to spend the summer taking a course at Williamston College. When she is here she meets a boy named Alex. In her efforts to impress two jaded classmates, she makes a hurtful movie about her mother and ignores her close friend Brian McBrian, who visits her at college to be with her. But after seeing how upset her mother is about her film, Tibby begins to reevaluate her actions, realizing that her friend Bailey, who died last summer of leukemia, would disapprove of her. She eventually ditches her new friends in favor of Brian and makes a heartfelt movie about Bailey instead.
 Bridget "Bee" Vreeland used to be a spunky and full of life soccer star who was described as "single-minded to the point of recklessness." But after rushing into a relationship with her coach, Eric, last summer, Bridget has withdrawn into herself, becoming quiet and sedentary, and she quit playing soccer.  She discovers letters written to her and her brother by her maternal grandmother, Greta Randolph, following her mother's death, and journeys to Alabama to visit Greta. She hides her identity for most of the summer, pretending to be "Gilda," a girl who offers to help Greta around the house in order to earn money for college. She learns a great deal about her grandparents and her mother, and in doing so, she starts to rediscover the old Bridget, including her love of soccer. At the summer's end, she reveals her true identity to her grandmother, who confesses that she knew all along, and they form a strong bond.
 Carmen Lucille Lowell is the sensitive, and caring, half-Puerto Rican "with the bad temper." Carmen's parents are divorced, and she lives with her mother, Christina. This summer, she is angered and frightened when her mother's relationship with David, a coworker, seems to be getting serious. Carmen worries that her mother is moving ahead with her life and leaving her behind. Carmen's attempts to foster her own romance with Porter, a classmate, are hindered by the distraction of her mother's new relationship. She criticizes her mother's actions, leading to Christina and David's break-up, and her mother's resulting depression causes her to realize that her mother deserves happiness, even if Carmen feels threatened by it. She helps to reunite David and Christina. She then meets her step-sister, related to her by her father’s new marriage, and is surprised to find that the obeying, sensible Krista had run away to Bethesda, just like she saw Carmen do when she was mad at her father. Carmen calls Paul, Krista’s brother and her step-brother about this and he told Carmen that she was trying to be like her. Later Krista and her family reunite and work things out.

From Santorini, Greece
Valia and Bapi Kaligaris are Lena and Effie's grandparents. Valia is talkative and spirited, like Effie, while Bapi is quiet and introspective like Lena. Bapi dies of a stroke at the end of the summer.
Kostos Dounas lives with his paternal grandparents in Santorini. He and Lena fell in love at the end of last summer, but she broke off their correspondence because she wanted to feel like her life "belonged to just her again," not wanting to live her life missing Kostas and yearning to spend time with him. They reunite briefly this summer, which ultimately ends in more heartbreak because she finds out that when she broke up with Kostas, he got a woman pregnant, and now feels like he has to marry her because of what he did.

In Bethesda, Maryland
Brian McBrian is a video game aficionado who spent hours every day playing Dragon Master at Seven Eleven, until he met Tibby last summer (through Bailey) and began spending most of his time with her. He has an unhappy home life with his mother and abusive stepfather, whom his mother married after his father died. He goes to visit Tibby at her summer college and is hurt when she dumps him for her new friends, although he ultimately forgives her. Tibby's friends believe that he has romantic feelings for her, although he does not reveal them in the 2nd book.
Porter is Carmen's classmate with whom she goes on a few dates over the summer. Although he genuinely likes her, Carmen is too distracted by her mother's romance and her aspirations for an accessory-like "Boyfriend" to start much of a relationship with him.

At Williamston College
Alex is a fellow summer film student. Tibby finds him intriguing, talented, and attractive, and she tries to impress him. She even shuns Brian when it becomes clear that Alex dislikes him. She eventually realizes, though, that Alex is a phony and ends their friendship.
Maura is Alex's friend and a film student from New York City.  She wears pink glasses. Tibby describes her as a "yeah-girl," who goes along with Alex.
Vanessa is the RA of the dorm where Tibby and Maura live for the summer.  Maura makes fun of the number of stuffed animals in her room, but when Vanessa reveals that she makes and sews them herself, Tibby begins to consider Vanessa, not Maura, the artist.

In South Carolina
Albert 'Al' Lowell is Carmen's father. He married Lydia Rodman last summer.
Lydia Rodman-Lowell is Al's second wife and the mother of Carmen's step-siblings, Paul and Krista.
Paul Rodman is two years older than Carmen and has an alcoholic father. He attends the University of Pennsylvania, his father's alma mater. He is serious and quiet, although he does pledge a fraternity. At the end of the summer, he meets Lena at a restaurant, and seems fascinated by her. They seem to have their own quiet chemistry.
Krista Rodman is Carmen's age. She and Carmen did not get along when they met last summer, but this summer Krista runs away to Bethesda in an effort to convince her mother that she wants to have her own identity.

In Alabama
Greta Randolph is Bridget's grandmother who, like Bridget's mother, suffers from diabetes. Greta was cut off from Bridget because of her bad relationship with Bridget's father. Over the summer, Bridget takes the name Gilda Tomko (combining the names of the gym where the Septembers first met and Tibby's mother's maiden name) to meet and work for Greta and obtain information about her mother. Greta, who was never fooled by the alias, helps Bridget discover her mother's past.
Billy Kline is Bridget's childhood friend, was in the same soccer team when they were kids, and became her holiday fling in Alabama. He is also known to be her little childhood boyfriend who still has feelings for her.

Family members of the Sisterhood
Georgos "George" Kaligaris is Lena's strict Greek father. Although his parents owned a restaurant in Greece, he is a lawyer. He has spent his adult life trying to repress his Greek heritage, until his father dies at the end of the summer.
Ariadne "Ari" Kaligaris is Lena's mother, an ambitious Greek woman who put herself through school to become a social worker. She had a lengthy, long-distance romance with a man called Eugene when she was younger. Shortly after they broke up, she met and married Lena's father.
Effie Kaligaris is Lena's extroverted sister, fifteen months younger. Effie gives Lena courage and comfort at times when the Sisterhood isn't there. Effie loves having boys be around her.
Franz Vreeland is Bridget's father, a former history professor and a teacher at a private high school. When Bridget was little, his favorite part of the day was when she would put his socks on for him because he doesn't have good things in his life since his wife died. He hasn't been very close to Bridget in her teenage years.
Marlene "Marly" Randolph Vreeland is Bridget's late mother, who committed suicide six and a half years ago after attending mental institutes and suffering from diabetes.
Perry Vreeland is Bridget's twin brother who shared a childhood with the Sisterhood but grew up to be a reclusive teenager. He was named for Marly's brother, Pervis Randolph.
Christina "Tina" Lowell is Carmen's 38-year-old mother. She is Puerto Rican and works as a treasurer for a law firm. She has never seriously dated since her divorce almost ten years ago, until this summer.
Mr. Rollins is Tibby's father. He is a lawyer who used to work as a public defender. He is not a major character. Although Tibby told Bailey in the first book that her parents were nineteen when she was born, in this book she says that his 40th birthday has passed.
Alice Tomko-Rollins is Tibby's 35-year-old mother, who was a hippie and a sculptor while Tibby was young. She is embarrassed by Tibby when she makes an embarrassing movie about her mother that is shown at open house at Williamston College not expecting her mom to be there.  Her last name was abandoned later on in her life.
Nicky and Katherine Rollins are Tibby's younger siblings.

References

External links
Sisterhood Central from Random House

2003 American novels
American novels adapted into films
Delacorte Press books